Tommie Draheim (born December 23, 1988) is an American former professional gridiron football offensive lineman. He played American football in the National Football League (NFL) and Canadian football in the Canadian Football League (CFL). He was signed by the Green Bay Packers as an undrafted free agent in 2012. He played college football at San Diego State.

College career
Draheim played college football at San Diego State. He started 33 games, including 30-consecutive starts to end his career.

He earned first-team All-Mountain West Conference honors as a senior, becoming the first Aztec offensive lineman to be named first-team all-league since 2003.

A three-year letterman, he helped SDSU rank 10th in the country in 2011 for fewest sacks allowed (0.83 per game) and blocked for a running back who finished No. 3 in the country with 1,711 rushing yards on the season.

Professional career

Green Bay Packers
After going undrafted in the 2012 NFL Draft, Draheim signed with the Green Bay Packers on May 11, 2012. On August 31, 2012, he was released by the Packers.

Seattle Seahawks
Draheim was signed to the Seattle Seahawks on September 6, 2012, but was released on September 11.

New England Patriots
Draheim was signed to the New England Patriots practice squad on December 4, 2012, but was released on December 11.

Jacksonville Jaguars
Draheim was signed to the Jacksonville Jaguars practice squad on December 18, 2012.

Kansas City Chiefs
Draheim signed with the Kansas City Chiefs on April 3, 2013. He was released from the practice squad on September 10.

Arizona Cardinals
Draheim was signed to the Arizona Cardinals practice squad on November 7, 2013. The Cardinals released Draheim on August 25, 2014.

BC Lions
Draheim signed with the BC Lions on May 5, 2015. He was released by the team on May 5, 2016.

Ottawa RedBlacks
Draheim was signed by the Ottawa RedBlacks on May 6, 2016.

Edmonton Eskimos
Draheim signed a contract extension with the Edmonton Football Team on December 30, 2020. He retired from football on July 9, 2021.

References

External links
San Diego State Aztecs bio 
Green Bay Packers bio 
Seattle Seahawks bio 
New England Patriots bio 
Jacksonville Jaguars bio 

1988 births
Living people
People from Kennewick, Washington
Players of American football from Washington (state)
San Diego State University alumni
San Diego State Aztecs football players
American football centers
Seattle Seahawks players
New England Patriots players
Jacksonville Jaguars players
Kansas City Chiefs players
Arizona Cardinals players
American players of Canadian football
BC Lions players
Ottawa Redblacks players
Canadian football offensive linemen
Green Bay Packers players
Edmonton Elks players